The 2021 NCAA Men's Gymnastics Championships were held from April 16-17, 2021 at the Maturi Pavilion in Minneapolis, Minnesota. Both of the qualifying sessions were broadcast live on Big Ten Network+, while the championship finals were televised live on Big Ten Network.

National qualifier sessions

Session 1
The first national qualifier session of the 2021 NCAA Men's Gymnastics Championships took place on April 16, 2021 at 2 PM. The following teams competed in Session 1.
No. 1 Oklahoma
No, 4 Nebraska
No. 5 Ohio State
No. 8 Illinois
No. 9 Navy
No. 12 William & Mary

Session 2
The second national qualifier session of the 2021 NCAA Men's Gymnastics Championships took place on April 16, 2021 at 8 PM. The following teams competed in Session 2.
No. 2 Michigan
No. 3 Stanford
No. 6 Penn State
No. 7 Iowa
No. 10 Minnesota
No. 11 California

NCAA Championship
The top three teams from each session advanced to the National Championship, which were televised live on the Big Ten Network on April 17 at 8 PM.

Standings
National Champion: Stanford – 414.521
2nd Place: Oklahoma – 411.591
3rd Place: Michigan – 410.358

Individual event finals
The top-three all-around competitors and top-three individuals on each event who are not members of one of the qualifying teams advanced from each pre-qualifying session to the finals session to compete for individual titles. Finals competition took place on April 17.

Medalists

References

NCAA Men's Gymnastics championship
2021 in American sports
NCAA Men's Gymnastics Championship
Sports competitions in Minnesota